Chaneti Buddhist Stupa is a 3rd century BC monument protected by the Government of India. The stupa is located in the Yamunanagar district of Haryana, three kilometers east of Jagadhri, and about three kilometers northwest of the archaeological site Sugh. The stupa has been referred by traveller Hiuen Tsang.

Architecture 
The stupa is hemispherical, made of baked bricks which are layered on each other in a concentric manner.

See also
 Buddhist pilgrimage sites in Haryana
 Buddhist pilgrimage sites
 Buddhist pilgrimage sites in India
 Amadalpur

References

Stupas in India
Monuments and memorials in Haryana
Pagodas in India
Buddhist pilgrimage sites in India
Buddhist sites in India
Yamunanagar district